The 1988 Virginia Slims of Kansas was a women's tennis tournament played on indoor hard courts at the Kansas Coliseum in Wichita, Kansas in the United States and was part of the Category 2 tier of the 1988 WTA Tour. It was the eighth edition of the tournament and ran from February 29 through March 6, 1988. First-seeded Manuela Maleeva won the singles title.

Finals

Singles

 Manuela Maleeva defeated  Sylvia Hanika 7–6(7–5), 7–5
 It was Maleeva's 1st singles title of the year and the 9th of her career.

Doubles

 Natalia Bykova /  Svetlana Parkhomenko defeated  Jana Novotná /  Catherine Suire 6–3, 6–4
 It was Bykova's 1st title of the year and the 1st of her career. It was Parkhomenko's only title of the year and the 8th of her career.

References

External links
 ITF tournament edition details
 Tournament draws

Virginia Slims of Kansas
Virginia Slims of Kansas
Virgin
Virgin
Virginia Slims of Kansas
Virginia Slims of Kansas